Woodard Schools is a group of Anglican schools (both primary and secondary) affiliated to the Woodard Corporation (formerly the Society of St Nicolas) which has its origin in the work of Nathaniel Woodard, a Church of England priest in the Anglo-Catholic tradition.

The Woodard Corporation has schools in both the independent (fee paying) and maintained sectors. It is the largest group of Church of England schools in England and Wales. The corporation owns 21 independent schools and is affiliated with 22 schools, both state, academy and independent. The flagship school of the Woodard Corporation is Lancing College, founded by Nathaniel Woodard in 1848, while the largest school is The Littlehampton Academy, with over 1,500 students. From 1 January 2014, Broadwater Manor School in Worthing was also owned by Lancing College and this group.

Owned schools
Ardingly College
 Ardingly College Prep School
 Ardingly College Pre-Prep School
 Bloxham School
 Denstone College
 Ellesmere College
 Hurstpierpoint College 
 Hurstpierpoint College Prep School 
 King's College, Taunton
 King's Hall School, Taunton
 Lancing College 
 Lancing College Preparatory School, Hove
 Lancing College Preparatory School, Worthing
 Peterborough High School
 Prestfelde School, Shrewsbury
 Queen Mary's School
 Denstone College Preparatory School
 St James' School, Grimsby
 The Cathedral School, Llandaff
 Worksop College
 Ranby House School

Affiliated schools
 Alderley Edge School for Girls
 Bishop Stopford School
 Crompton House Church of England Academy
 Derby Grammar School
 Derby High School
 Malosa Secondary School, Malawi
 St Peter's Collegiate Academy
 St Marylebone Church of England School
 St George's Church of England School
 St Olave's and St Saviour's Grammar School
 St Peter's Church of England Aided School
 St Saviour's and St Olave's Church of England School
 The Bishop of Hereford's Bluecoat School
 The Bishops' Blue Coat Church of England High School
 The King's School, Rochester
 King Solomon International Business School

Academies
Woodard Schools are the lead sponsors of a number of schools in the English Academy system. 
Woodward Schools push for a strong religious teaching within, with an emphasis on biblical studies. Students should conform to Christianity and teachings of the Bible.:

 Kings Priory School
 St Augustine Academy, Maidstone
 St Peter's Academy, Stoke-on-Trent
 St Wilfrid's Church of England Academy, Blackburn
 The Littlehampton Academy - replaces the existing Littlehampton Community School
 The Sir Robert Woodard Academy - replaces the existing Boundstone Community College
 Wren Academy

Former schools
Abbots Bromley School, Rugeley, Staffordshire
The Bolitho School, Cornwall
 Cawston College
 Grenville College
 Queen Ethelburga's Collegiate
 Queen Margaret's School
 St Margaret's School, Exeter
 St Winifred's School

References

External links
 Woodard Schools

 
Education in England
Woodard
Educational charities based in the United Kingdom